Renmin Subdistrict is a subdistrict of the Yuexiu District in Guangzhou City, Guangdong Province, southern China. , it administers the following 15 residential neighborhoods:
Anyeli Community
Xingxianli Community
Haizhushi Community
Guocaixi Community
Qinglanli Community
Jinghaimen Community
Taipingtongjin Community
Mupaitou Community
Shijiangjun Community
Dadezhong Community
Daxinzhong Community
Yudaihao Community
Sanfuqian Community
Zhuangyuanfang Community
Yidexi Community

Shijiangjun, Dadezhong, Daxinzhong, Yudaihao, Sanfuqian, Zhuangyuanfang and Yidexi were administered by Daxin Subdistrict before it was abolished in 2013.

References 

Administrative divisions of Yuexiu District
Subdistricts of the People's Republic of China